Matryona Ivanovna Kiseleva (1855 — ) was the leader sect of «Ioannites».

In her youth Matryona was a prostitute. Matryona Ivanovna Kiseleva was the spiritual daughter of John of Kronstadt. Kiseleva moved from Kronstadt to Oranienbaum in 1895, where the center of the sect's functioning moved after it, and she formed a community of women who lived under monastic discipline and worshiped at St. Andrew's Cathedral. She also attracted male followers from Saint Andrew's Cathedral of the sect consider Kiseleva a prophetess and called her «Theotokos» (bogoroditsa), «Porfiriia», «the porfiriia of the Tsar of Tsars», «Oranienbaum Mother of God». John's sectarians called «Jesus Christ —  Tsar of Tsars». Other sectarians had names: Mikhail Petrov (the «Archangel Michael») is a Yaroslavl peasant, Elizaveta Korchacheva («Solomoniia the Myrrh-bearer») is a former prostitute, Nazarii Dmitriev («John the Theologian») is a Novgorod peasant, Basilii Pustoshkin («Elijah») is landlord Kronstadt Hospice House, Nicholai Bolshakov («Enoch») is a bath attendant.

Porfiriia Kiseleva is glorified by sectarians in special hymns in honor of her, for example:
«Virgo is wise Porfira,
You suffered for Christ,
You had in oneself 
A high-valued Christ's stone»
Ioannites depicted Matryona on icons, and the icons are rendered equal with the sacred images of worship.

Porfiriia confessed to John of Kronstadt. She died of syphilis on 25 November 1905. John of Kronstadt performed the funeral of Kiseleva. During the funeral service, instead of the prayers prescribed by the charter, they sang a prayer: «The Most Holy Theotokos, Save us!» The very place of Kisseleva's burial (in Oranienbaum) is the subject of special veneration of the sectarians, the things left after it and sand from the grave are of religious significance for them.

After the death of John of Kronstadt, in 1912 the Holy Synod of the Russian Orthodox Church condemned the Ioannites and declared them a sect; Kiseleva was declared a main sectarian. The sect in official documents was named «Khlysts–Kiselevists» from the name of Porfiriia Kiseleva.

The image of Kiseleva found reflection in art. Victor Protopopov wrote the play «Black Crows» in 1905. The play was a huge success on the stages of theaters and in theaters it was always a full house. In this play, John of Kronstadt was portrayed as a pseudo-healer, and his supporters - «Ioannites», led by Kiseleva, as fanatics-sectarians. The «Ioannites» rise in arms against the play that had exposed them. People's Artist of the USSR Ekaterina Korchagina-Alexandrovskaya, who played in those years in one of the Petersburg troupes, says: "In the «Black Crows», I played the role of a sectarian "Theotokos". Religious fanatics were furious, and often to me, "in order to avoid excesses", I had to return home after the performance, accompanied by guards, who protected me from sectarian attempts to crack down on me when leaving theater".

References

 Kizenko N. B. A Prodigal Saint: Father John of Kronstadt and the Russian People. Pennsylvania State University Press, 2000. p. 213
 Святое православие и именобожническая ересь : в 3-х ч. - Харьков : Епархиальная тип., 1916. cтр. 26
 Robert P. Geraci, Michael Khodarkovsky Of Religion and Empire: Missions, Conversion, and Tolerance in Tsarist Russia /  Cornell University Press, 2001 p. 54
 Сукновалов, Александр Евгеньевич ″Петроградская сторона″ Издательство: Л.: Лениздат; 1961 г. / стр. 55
 К характеристике о. Иоанна Сергиева (Кронштадского). // Старообрядец : журнал. — 1906. — № 2. — С. 217—221.
 Таевский, Дмитрий Александрович «Христианские ереси и секты I-XXI веков». Словарь. 2003 год.
 Киселевцы Απολογία.ru
 Куляшев, Андрей Гаврилович. / Лекции по истории и обличению сектантства как рационалистического, так и мистического, читанные на миссионерских курсах в Пермской епархии в 1912 и 1913 годах : Конспект / А. Куляшев. - Пермь : Типо-лит. Губ. правл., 1913. - 6, 208, 2, XXXIV с.; С. 150-151
 А. И. Добкин, А. В. Кобак, Санкт-Петербургский фонд культуры / Невский архив: историко-краеведческий сборник, Том 7 / Стр. 364
 Введенский, Александр Петрович. / Действующия законоположения касательно старообрядцев и сектантов / Александр Введенский. - Одесса : Тип. Одесских новостей, 1912 (на обл. 1913). - 197, VII с.; С. 140
 Образование: журнал литературный и общественно-политический, Том 14, Выпуск 6 / Стр. 100
 Зимина Н. П. Православная Энциклопедия/  Т. 25, С. 127-139/ Иоанниты

Religious leaders from the Russian Empire